The Folkestone Formation is a geological formation in the United Kingdom. It forms part of the Lower Greensand Group, and dates to the early part of the Albian stage of the Early Cretaceous. It primarily consists of medium to coarsed grained unconsolidated sand and weakly cemented sandstone. It was likely deposited in a shallow beach setting. Dinosaur tracks have been reported from the formation, including those of theropods, ornithopods, and possibly ankylosaurs.

References

Albian Stage
Lower Cretaceous Series of Europe
Cretaceous England